Music at Night is a play by J. B. Priestley. Although written in 1938 for the Malvern Drama Festival, and performed there on 2 August, the outbreak of World War II meant that its performance in London at the Westminster Theatre was delayed until 10 October 1939; it was the first play to be performed in London after restrictions were lifted. It was published in 1944.

Plot introduction
An assortment of middle- and upper-class people come to the house of the widowed Mrs Amesbury to hear a new violin concerto by David Shiel. As the music plays their minds wander, and their reveries are theatrically performed. Each act of the play corresponds with a movement of the concerto: Allegro capriccioso, Lento, and Allegro — agitato — maestoso nobile.

Characters
 David Shiel, a composer
 Nicholas Lengel, first violin, a refugee
 Mrs Amesbury, a wealthy sponsor
 Katherine Shiel, David's wife
 Peter Horlett, a Communist poet
 Ann Winter, a childhood friend and fan of Peter
 Philip Chilham, a columnist for the Daily Gazette
 Lady Sybil Linchester, a tactless wit from a rich family
 Sir James Dirnie, her husband, an aspiring patron of the arts
 Charles Bendrex, a Cabinet minister
 Parks, an elderly manservant
 Rupert Amesbury, a pilot, the deceased son of Mrs Amesbury
 Mrs Chilham, Philip's mother
 Tom, a former coworker whom Sir James betrayed
 Deborah, Sybil's elder sister
 Dr Ebenthal, David's former teacher in Vienna

1938 plays
Plays by J. B. Priestley